Adam "Mad Dog" MacDougall (born 8 May 1975) is an Australian author, businessman and former professional rugby league footballer who played in the 1990s and 2000s. He has also played for the Sydney Roosters and South Sydney Rabbitohs. His brothers, Luke MacDougall, Ben MacDougall and Scott MacDougall have also played in the NRL. His father, Gil MacDougall, played for the Balmain Tigers and Western Suburbs Magpies NSWRFL.

In retirement, MacDougall founded a nutrition company that produces the popular meal replacement product, The MAN Shake.

Background
MacDougall was born in Sydney, New South Wales, Australia.

Sydney Roosters
MacDougall made his first-grade debut for the Sydney City Roosters in the 1995 ARL season.

Newcastle Knights
MacDougall is third on the club's all time try scorers list and sixth on the club's all time point-scorers list.

In MacDougall's first season with Newcastle he scored five tries in eleven games that culminated in the club's victory in the 1997 ARL Grand Final where he famously, but accidentally stood on the head of Manly-Warringah captain Geoff Toovey after being tackled by the Manly halfback.

In 1998, MacDougall made his representative debut for New South Wales rugby league team after a stellar start to the season.

On 8 July 1998, MacDougall tested positive to stimulants ephedrine and amfepramone. MacDougall's A and B samples both also recorded an epitestosterone to testosterone level greater than the allowable 6:1 ratio – indicating the possible use of steroids. On 28 August he pleaded guilty to using one banned stimulant and was found to have inadvertently used another and received an 11-match ban along with teammates Robbie O'Davis and Wayne Richards who each received 22-week bans. It was revealed during his appeal that MacDougall had suffered a severe head injury in 1993 that damaged his pituitary gland and it was essential that he take prescribed medication, called Sustanon 250, which included a banned steroid. This medication restored normal hormone levels in his body and without it, he would suffer potentially serious side effects and not be able to lead a normal life, let alone play football.

After just two games back for the Knights in 1999, MacDougall was recalled to the New South Wales rugby league team.

Arguably MacDougall's best seasons came in 2000 and 2001, where he scored 30 tries in 41 games and starred in NSW comprehensive 3–0 series win against Queensland in 2000.

He also played in Australia's victory in the 2000 World Cup Final.  In round 20 2001, MacDougall equalled Darren Albert's club record of four tries in a match during Newcastle's 37–30 victory over the New Zealand Warriors at Ericsson Stadium. MacDougall won a second premiership with the Knights, playing on the wing in their 2001 NRL Grand Final victory over the Parramatta Eels. After that he went on the 2001 Kangaroo tour.

South Sydney Rabbitohs
MacDougall switched to the South Sydney Rabbitohs for the 2004 NRL season.

Return to the Knights
MacDougall re-commenced playing for the Knights in the 2007 NRL season. He had already enjoyed a long and successful career with the Knights, having played with them from 1996 to 2003.

In Round 26 of the 2011 NRL season, MacDougall was farewelled in his last home game for the Knights. He played his last game the following week against the Melbourne Storm at AAMI Park in the first week of the finals series.

Career highlights 
Junior Club: Harbord Diggers, De La Salle-Caringbah
Career Stats: 195 career games with 92 tries

Representative games 
State of Origin: Played 11 games in total for New South Wales
International: Played 11 tests for Australia including the 2000 World Cup

The MAN Shake 
In retirement, MacDougall, who has master's degrees in Business Administration and Business Coaching as well as a Bachelor of Economics, started a nutrition company called Cranky Health. Its flagship product is The MAN Shake, a meal replacement made specifically for men. The company also produces protein bars and meal replacement shakes for women called The Lady Shake.

In 2015, MacDougall released his first book with publisher Penguin Books called The Man Plan. The books promotes a healthy lifestyle for men, focusing on simple 10-minute workouts and easy to follow recipes. He also launched The Man Challenge, an online health and fitness program specifically created for the needs of men. The Man Challenge is built on the premise of exercising for just 10 minutes a day and giving men a simple to follow meal plan that still allows them to enjoy a beer and a burger. Also involved is AFL Premiership winning Coach Paul Roos who acts as a motivator for users of the program, while another feature includes taking on celebrity athletes such as Sonny Bill Williams to exercise challenges.

References

External links 

2011 Newcastle Knights Profile
2001 Ashes profile 
The MAN Shake website
Daily Telegraph article on The MAN Plan

1975 births
Living people
Australia national rugby league team players
Australian people of Scottish descent
Australian rugby league players
Australian sportspeople in doping cases
Country New South Wales Origin rugby league team players
Doping cases in Australian rugby league
Doping cases in rugby league
Adam
New South Wales Rugby League State of Origin players
Newcastle Knights players
Prime Minister's XIII players
Rugby league centres
Rugby league fullbacks
Rugby league players from Sydney
Rugby league wingers
South Newcastle Lions players
South Sydney Rabbitohs players
Sportsmen from New South Wales
Sydney Roosters players